Elena Vitalyevna Kochneva (born 27 August 1989) is a former Russian footballer who played as a goalkeeper. She was a member of the Russian national team and was part of the Russian squad that participated at  UEFA Women's Euro 2009.

References

External links

1989 births
Sportspeople from Irkutsk
CSP Izmailovo players
Zvezda 2005 Perm players
WFC Krasnodar players
Russian women's footballers
Russia women's international footballers
Women's association football goalkeepers
Living people